The Rudna mine is a large underground mine in the west of Poland in Polkowice, Polkowice County,  south-west of the capital, Warsaw. Rudna represents one of the largest copper and silver reserve in Poland having estimated reserves of 513 million tonnes of ore grading 1.78% copper and 42 g/tonnes silver. The annual ore production is around 13 million tonnes from which 231,000 tonnes of copper and 546 tonnes of silver are extracted.

Incidents
On 20 March 2013, 19 miners were pulled alive and well from the mine after being trapped  underground for seven hours, following a small earthquake the previous night.

On 29 November 2016, a magnitude 4.4 earthquake at shallow depth left eight miners dead.

References

External links 
 Official site

Copper mines in Poland
Polkowice County
Mining rescues